Shingo Kunieda defeated Gustavo Fernández in the final, 6–2, 5–7, 7–5 to win the men's singles wheelchair tennis title at the 2022 French Open. It was his eighth French Open singles title and his 27th major singles title overall.

Alfie Hewett was the two-time defending champion, but was defeated by Fernández in the semifinals.

Seeds

Draw

Finals

References

External links
 Draw

Wheelchair Men's Singles
French Open, 2022 Men's Singles